Frode Johnsen (born 17 March 1974) is a Norwegian former professional footballer who played for Odd and Rosenborg in the Tippeligaen and for Nagoya Grampus and Shimizu S-Pulse in Japan. He played in several positions, but was preferred as a striker or midfielder. Johnsen is 188 cm tall, and was a good header of the ball.

In his final season for Odds BK in 2015, Johnsen won the Kniksen's Honour Award for his long career as a footballer. He retired in the age of 41. In 2013, he became the topscorer in Tippeligaen, which also made him the oldest topscorer in a European league ever.

Club career

Early years
Johnsen began his career with minnows Skotfoss TIF, but did not make his Tippeligaen debut until a switch to Odd Grenland where he made his debut in the Norwegian Premier League in 1999 at the age of 25.

Rosenborg

2000
He was transferred to Rosenborg mid-season in 2000, as a replacement for John Carew. Johnsen previously studied to be a police officer during his time in Odd Grenland, but quit school to play for Rosenborg. He played fifteen games for Rosenborg in his first season, scoring nine goals – 12 in total, as he scored three goals for Odd before the switch. His new club and he won the championship. Rosenborg narrowly missed out on qualifying from the group stage of the Champions League. Johnsen did very well, scoring five goals in six games – including a hat-trick against Helsingborg. As they finished third, they advanced to the UEFA Cup where they crashed out in the first round to Alavés, Johnsen scored the goal in the 1–1 away leg, but could not prevent Rosenborg from losing 3–1 at home.

2001
In his first full season he became joint top-scorer with 17 goals (shared with Thorstein Helstad and Clayton Zane), playing in all games but one. Rosenborg won the league again by a single point ahead of Lillestrøm. In the Champions League Rosenborg finished fourth in their group. Johnsen played in all six games but one and did not score any goals, though he netted one in the qualifiers.

2002
Johnsen won his third championship in a row in 2002. He only played in 17 out of 26 games due to injury, scoring seven goals. In the Champions League he scored twice in the qualification round, but did not score any in the group stages as Rosenborg only got four points and finished last, despite losing only two games.

2003
He was involved in every game in the 2003 season as Rosenborg cruised through the championship, winning by 14 points. Johnsen scored 15 goals, only beaten with two by teammate Harald Brattbakk. He also won the cup with Rosenborg over Bodø/Glimt, scoring the equaliser as Rosenborg eventually won 3–1. He was the top scorer of the cup, scoring 11 goals in seven games. In the Champions League, Rosenborg and Johnsen failed to reach the group stage, losing narrowly to Deportivo in the qualifiers. They still got to play UEFA Cup, and had a good run before losing on away goals to Benfica. Johnsen played in all but one game in Europe this season, scoring two goals in nine games.

2004
The 2004 season was dramatic and very memorable season for Frode Johnsen. Rosenborg fought with Vålerenga for the championship, and before the last game of the season, Rosenborg was in the lead, but only on more scored goals. Seven minutes from time in Rosenborg's game against FC Lyn, Vålerenga made it 3–0 in their league game. Rosenborg was leading 3–1 at the time and needed one more to win the league, and in stoppage time Frode Johnsen scored his third of the game with a diving header, winning the championship . Johnsen played in all game and was named top scorer that year, notching up 19 goals in the process. He did not score as many in Europe, but nevertheless, Rosenborg was back in the Champions League. Only two points this time, and Johnsen scored two goals in total (w/ Q-rounds).

2005
After winning five championships in a row, the 2005 season was a devastating one as his team only finished 7th. Johnsen scored only seven goals in his 23 games that season. In 2005, both RCD Mallorca and AC Sparta Prague were interested in signing Johnsen, but nothing happened. He was involved in all Champions League games, but did not score. They finished third in a group which contained Real Madrid, Lyon and Olympiacos, but was eliminated in the first UEFA Cup round against FC Zenit St. Petersburg.

2006
Frode Johnsen started the season well, and halfway through the season he had scored six goals in 13 games before Nagoya Grampus Eight came knocking. Johnsen could not resist the chance of going to play abroad and after serving Rosenborg faithfully for a number of years, they let him go and sold him in July 2006.

In all competitions, Johnsen played 234 games and scored 125 goals for Rosenborg.

Nagoya Grampus
He signed an 18-month contract and started his Nagoya career by scoring twice in an away match against JEF United Chiba on 29 July 2006. Nagoya won the match 3–2. He scored eight more times finishing with ten goals in 18 games as Nagoya Grampus finished in 7th place.

In his first full season in 2007, Nagoya only managed an 11th place. He scored 13 goals in 26 games.

In 2008, Johnsen and Nagoya fought for the J1 League championship until the final day, but ended up in third place, qualifying for an Asian Champions league spot.

On 28 October 2008, Frode Johnsen stated that he would stay in Japan for at least one more year, either for Nagoya or another Japanese club.

Shimizu S-Pulse
On 18 November 2008, Frode Johnsen announced that he would be leaving Nagoya after this season, and that he was only a medical away from securing a move to another Japanese club. He did not reveal which club it was until the 2008 season was over. It was eventually known that he would join Shimizu S-Pulse for the 2009 season.

Shimizu S-Pulse finished in 7th place in his first season and five points from an AFC Champions League place, as Johnsen scored nine league goals.

On 1 August Johnsen scored his first hat-trick in the J-League in a 6–3 win against Shonan Bellmare.

On 14 November 2010, Johnsen scored one goal in a 5–0 win against Shonan Bellmare in what will be his last league game in Japan. He has announced that he will return to Norway after this season.

International career
Frode Johnsen has 34 caps, and has scored 10 goals for the Norwegian national team. He made his debut against Finland on 16 August 2000 coming on for Steffen Iversen 20 minutes from time.

His first international goal came against Wales in a 2002 FIFA World Cup qualifier. He remained a regular member of the Norway squad until 2007, but lost his place after moving to Japan. The long flight distance between Europe and Japan was cited as one of the reasons why he did not play in more games after joining Nagoya Grampus.

On 1 September 2013, Johnsen was recalled to the national team squad, more than six years after his last cap, ahead of the 2014 World Cup qualifying matches against Cyprus and Switzerland. He did not play in either match, but kept his place in the squad for the matches against Slovenia and Iceland in October 2013. In the match against Slovenia on 11 October 2013, Johnsen came on as a late substitute, becoming the oldest player ever to play for the Norwegian national team.

Career statistics

Club

Note: Europe continental also includes Royal League (2004 season)

International goals
Scores and results list Norway's goal tally first, score column indicates score after each Johnsen goal.

Honours
Rosenborg
Norwegian Premier League (6): 2000, 2001, 2002, 2003, 2004, 2006
Norwegian Football Cup: 2003

Individual
Tippeligaen Top goalscorer: 2001, 2004, 2013
Norwegian Football Association Gold Watch
Norwegian Cup Top goalscorer: 2014

References

External links

Player profile from RBKweb
Player profile from RBKweb (nor)

1974 births
Living people
Sportspeople from Skien
Association football forwards
Norwegian footballers
Norway international footballers
Odds BK players
Rosenborg BK players
Eliteserien players
Norwegian First Division players
J1 League players
Nagoya Grampus players
Shimizu S-Pulse players
Norwegian expatriate footballers
Norwegian expatriate sportspeople in Japan
Expatriate footballers in Japan